Paloma Valley High School is a public four-year high school located in Menifee, California. The school is part of the Perris Union High School District. It opened for its first school year on September 7, 1995. The mascot is the Wildcat. Paloma Valley High School was ranked by Newsweek magazine as the 374th best high school in California. Students have the opportunity to take Advanced Placement coursework and exams. The AP participation rate at Paloma Valley High School is 35 percent. The student body makeup is 51 percent male and 49 percent female, and the total minority enrollment is 65 percent.

Curriculum

2014 academic indicators
 National Rank: #1,736 
 College Readiness Index: 21.9 
 Academic Performance Index: 815
 Student/Teacher Ratio: 29:1

Wildcat Formal Exchange

Homophobic allegations
On March 2, 2011, it was reported that a teacher at Paloma Valley High School allegedly wrote an 'S' on a lesbian student's hand and repeatedly referred to the student as a "sinner" throughout class. The student reported the alleged incident against the teacher on October 14, but the teacher has only recently been "dealt with" according to Leslie Ventuleth, the Riverside County School District’s chief human resources officer. As of Oct. 29, 2015, the identities of the student and the teacher have yet to be released.

"Teachers and students say that even though they have complained, the district has refused to do anything about it."

The school's Gay Straight Alliance was forbidden last fall from sharing information about Gay, Lesbian, Bisexual and Transgender History Month during school announcements. Paloma Valley's vice president of the Gay Straight Alliance had proposed the idea. She hoped to share information during announcements about prominent gay people. She said her proposal was rejected, and that she was told such announcements weren't allowed for any history month. Later, during Black History Month in February, the Black Student Union made announcements similar to those proposed by the Gay Straight Alliance. She continued and was one of several students who complained to Perris Union school board members last month. "I'm frustrated that my school would do something like this," she said at the meeting.

Notable alumni
 Nia Sanchez, winner of Miss USA 2014
 Matt Orzech, Long Snapper for the Los Angeles Rams
 Mark Holcomb, guitarist in the djent/metal band Periphery

References

External links
 Paloma Valley High School News
 Teacher ‘Dealt With’ After Allegedly Calling Gay Student A Sinner – KCAL-TV

Educational institutions established in 1995
High schools in Riverside County, California
Public high schools in California
Menifee, California
1995 establishments in California